Petroglyph National Monument stretches  along Albuquerque, New Mexico's West Mesa, a volcanic basalt escarpment that dominates the city's western horizon. Authorized June 27, 1990, the 7,236 acre (29.28 km2) monument is cooperatively managed by the National Park Service and the City of Albuquerque. The western boundary of the monument features a chain of dormant fissure volcanoes. Beginning in the northwest corner, Butte volcano is followed to its south by Bond, Vulcan, Black and JA volcanoes.

Petroglyph National Monument protects a variety of cultural and natural resources including five volcanic cones, hundreds of archeological sites and an estimated 24,000 petroglyph images carved by Ancestral Pueblo peoples and early Spanish settlers. Many of the images are recognizable as animals, people, brands and crosses; others are more complex. Their meaning was, possibly, understood only by the carver. These images are the cultural heritage of a people who have long since moved into other areas and moved on through history for many reasons.  The monument is intended as a protection for these lands and sites from and for visitors to see and appreciate for generations to come.  The national monument is managed in a manner that allows recreational use. The monument has four major sites that visitors can access, Boca Negra Canyon, Rinconada Canyon, Piedras Marcadas Canyon, and the Volcano Day Use trails.

Geologic history 
Approximately 200,000 years ago, six volcanic eruptions created a  cliff containing thick basalt layers of rock and cooled lava. When the volcanoes erupted, molten lava ranging in depth from 5 to 50 feet flowed downhill using old water ways, called arroyos, which eventually formed triangular, peninsula shaped channels that flowed around hills. The hills have long since eroded away over time, while the stronger basalt rocks remained, which eventually cracked and formed canyons and escarpments. As time progressed, more eruptions occurred and thicker lava cooled to form the now-extinct volcanic cones to the west of the monument; these cones can be seen from the top of the mesa. This unique formation of the landscape is called reverse topography.

The basalt rocks' geologic nature allows for the creation of the petroglyphs, or rock carvings, on their surface. The rocks contain high concentrations of iron, manganese and calcium; this combination creates rocks of a gray-like color. However, over thousands of years of exposure to the desert's rough environment, a "desert varnish" forms on the surface. The varnish is formed from the oxidization, or rusting, of the manganese and iron when mixed with oxygen in the air and water from rain; this varnish is dark, almost-black and glossy in appearance. Long ago, Native Americans, as well as Spanish settlers discovered that images can be created on the faces of the rocks by chipping away at this layer using rocks and other tools.

Cultural history and significance 
The petroglyph images within the monument hold deep cultural significance to Pueblo peoples and neighboring Native peoples. This rock art has complex and varied meanings.

Archaeologists have dated some carvings, primarily those in the Boca Negra Canyon area, as far back as 3,000 years ago. The relative age is determined based on the darkness of the image, its context, and its comparison to other works of the same age. It is estimated that about 90 percent of the petroglyphs were created during the period between AD 1300 until the end of the 17th century because of the "Southwestern Style" used. At this time, the Native population was increasing quickly and Pueblo adobe villages were being built along the Rio Grande River and at the base of the Sandia Mountains.

Stupa controversy
In 1989, at least a year prior to the National Monument's establishment, a Tibetan Buddhist stupa was built and consecrated on what was then private land owned by Harold Cohen and Ariane Emery.  The National Park Service subsequently used eminent domain to seize this land and make it part of the Monument, over the owners' objections.  The stupa was not removed, but all buildings on the land were razed.

On June 10, 2010, the Superintendent of Petroglyph National Monument sent an email stating that "[w]hile soils are being stockpiled nearby for the future construction of an amphitheater, the National Park Service has no plans for the Stupa." The Monument website was also updated to describe the construction projects and clarify that the Stupa was not to be demolished.

Other controversies

Suburban development currently affects the Petroglyph National Monument site. The city of Albuquerque succeeded with their plans to build a 4 lane highway directly through the site itself.  The issue was featured in the documentary, Reclaiming Their Voice: The Native American Vote in New Mexico & Beyond.

Documents posted on June 6, 2012, by Public Employees for Environmental Responsibility (PEER) allege that although the Petroglyph National Monument is a valuable resource and location for the City of Albuquerque and the state of New Mexico, the historical  resources contained within is in danger because of the City and the National Park Service (NPS) inability manage up to two-thirds of the monument that is City-owned land. In their opinion, there are no persistent standards or patrols protecting the petroglyphs or the surrounding areas.

Under a five-year Cooperative Management Agreement, National Park Service and the City specify the delegation of their respective responsibilities for the monument. The city, however, refuses to allow NPS rangers to patrol or enforce Park Service rules on City lands, which constitute the bulk of the monument. Due to City service cutbacks, most of the Petroglyph is left unpatrolled. In a July 25, 2011 letter to PEER, NPS Intermountain Regional Director John Wessels stated –

Southwest PEER Director Daniel Patterson said "It is a disgrace that ancient rock art is obscured by both years of debris and last weekend's vandalism ... Petroglyph is not just a regional but a national treasure which deserves the same protections as other national parks."

The 2008 Cooperative Management Agreement must be renewed by May 2013. PEER has launched a citizen petition and national campaign to persuade Albuquerque Mayor Richard J. Berry to allow NPS to provide full monument protection in the upcoming cooperative management pact.

Gallery of petroglyphs at Petroglyph National Monument

Gallery of volcanoes in Petroglyph National Monument

See also
List of national monuments of the United States
List of petroglyph sites
List of Stone Age art

References

External links

 National Park Service: Petroglyph National Monument
 A Report on the Petroglyph National Monument
  Reclaiming Their Voice: The Native American Vote in New Mexico & Beyond

Petroglyphs in New Mexico
1990 establishments in New Mexico
Geography of Albuquerque, New Mexico
Archaeological sites on the National Register of Historic Places in New Mexico
National Park Service National Monuments in New Mexico
Protected areas of Bernalillo County, New Mexico
Museums in Bernalillo County, New Mexico
Native American museums in New Mexico
Native Americans in Albuquerque, New Mexico
Protected areas established in 1990
National Register of Historic Places in Albuquerque, New Mexico